The women's 200 metres event at the 1995 Pan American Games was held at the Estadio Atletico "Justo Roman" on 21 and 22 March.

Medalists

Results

Heats
Wind:Heat 1: +0.9 m/s, Heat 2: +1.0 m/s, Heat 3: +2.0 m/s

Final
Wind: +0.7 m/s

References

Athletics at the 1995 Pan American Games
1995
Pan